In linguistics, troponymy is the presence of a 'manner' relation between two lexemes.  

The concept was originally proposed by Christiane Fellbaum and George Miller. Some examples they gave are "to nibble is to eat in a certain manner, and to gorge is to eat in a different manner.  Similarly, to traipse or to mince is to walk in some manner".  

Troponymy is one of the possible relations between verbs in the semantic network of the WordNet database.

See also

Hyponymy and hypernymy
 
 Is-a
 Hypernymy (and supertype)
 Hyponymy (and subtype)
 Has-a
 Holonymy
 Meronymy

 Lexical chain
 Ontology (information science)
 Polysemy
 Semantic primes
 Semantic satiation
 Thematic role
 Word sense
 Word sense disambiguation

References

Inline citations

Sources

Semantic relations